Fannie S. Herrington (1869–1931) buried at Barratt's Chapel. She was Secretary of State of Delaware from November 1925 until March 1926. She was the second wife of Dr. Caleb R. Layton, married October 2, 1926.

References

Secretaries of State of Delaware
Women in Delaware politics
1869 births
1931 deaths